Harry Dean may refer to:

Harry Dean (cricketer) (1884–1957), English cricketer
Harry Dean (musician) (1879–1955), Canadian conductor, pianist, organist, and music educator
Harry Dean (baseball) (1915–1960), American Major League pitcher
Harry Dean (politician) (1913–1997), Queensland politician
Harry Dean Stanton (1926–2017), American actor, musician and singer

See also
Harry Deane (1846–1925), American baseball player in the National Association
Henry Dean (disambiguation)
Henry Deane (disambiguation)